Yavuz İlnam (born July 23, 1987) is a Turkish trap shooter. He is a member of Istanbul Hunting and Shooting Club.

İlnamı won the bronze medal in the men's trap, and the gold medal in the men's team trap event at the 2015 Summer Universiade in Gwangju, South Korea.

He earned a quota spot for the 2016 Summer Olympics.

References

1987 births
Sportspeople from Istanbul
Turkish male sport shooters
Trap and double trap shooters
Living people
Shooters at the 2016 Summer Olympics
Olympic shooters of Turkey
European Games competitors for Turkey
Shooters at the 2019 European Games
Medalists at the 2015 Summer Universiade
Universiade medalists in shooting
Universiade gold medalists for Turkey
Universiade bronze medalists for Turkey
21st-century Turkish people